The Great Wheel was a  Ferris wheel built for the Empire of India Exhibition at Earls Court in London in 1895.

Great Wheel may also refer to:
 Great Wheel Corporation, a company specialising in Ferris wheels
 Seattle Great Wheel, a Ferris wheel erected in 2012
 Grande Roue de Paris, a Ferris wheel erected in 1900

Ferris wheels that were proposed but never built
 Beijing Great Wheel (China)
 Great Berlin Wheel (Germany)
 Great Dubai Wheel (UAE)
 Great Orlando Wheel (US)

Fiction
 Great Wheel cosmology, a concept in the Dungeons & Dragons game
 The Great Wheel, a children's book by Robert Lawson

See also
 Giant Wheel (disambiguation)